Penn Yan Boat Company, which produced a wide range of wooden and fiberglass powerboats, sailboats, canoes and rowboats, was founded in 1921 by German-native Charles A. Herrman.  It derived its name from the location of its headquarters, Penn Yan, New York. At its founding, the company built wood boats and canoes, switching to all fiberglass production in the early 1960s. No records are known to survive.

In 1936, Penn Yan introduced its "Car Top" outboard boat.  The Car Top, which Penn Yan marketed as being easily lifted by two people, was designed to be light and narrow enough to fit on top of most cars of that era.

Among other innovations, Penn Yan was known for its patented "Tunnel Drive" concept, whereby a cavity was molded into the bottom of the boat's hull, partially enclosing the propeller and drive shaft.  The tunnel drive system provided better boat speed and stability.

The company was sold to new owners in 1979 and finally ceased operations in 2001.

References

External links
 Penn Yan Antique and Classic Boat Owners Club
 Finger Lakes Boating Museum Area Builders: Penn Yan Boat Company
 Video: Beginning Restoration on a Penn Yan Canoe

American boat builders
Vehicle manufacturing companies established in 1921
Manufacturing companies disestablished in 2001
Defunct manufacturing companies based in New York (state)